Archie Cameron Matthews (born 2 August 2001) is an English professional footballer who plays as a goalkeeper for  club Oxford City, on loan from  club Swansea City. Matthews came through the youth system at Swindon Town and spent time on loan at Southern League clubs AFC Totton, Thatcham Town and Melksham Town before making his Football League debut for Swindon in February 2021. Released at the end of the season, he signed for Birmingham City. He spent time on loan at National League South club Bath City in 2021 and Gloucester City of the National League North in 2022 before being released, and then signed for Swansea City.

Club career

Swindon Town
Matthews joined Swindon Town's academy as a 15-year-old, and took up a scholarship in 2017. His first matchday involvement with the first team came on 23 March 2019: with Lawrence Vigouroux away on international duty, Luke McCormick kept goal and Matthews was on the bench for a 4–0 League Two win against Morecambe. He was an unused substitute twice more that season, and in May 2019, together with fellow academy graduates Jacob Bancroft, Ralph Graham and Luke Haines, Matthews signed his first professional contract.

Matthews spent much of the next 18 months out on loan at Southern League Division One South clubs. He signed for AFC Totton the day before the season started, and went straight into the starting eleven for a 3–1 defeat at home to Larkhall Athletic. He made one more league appearance, but his loan came to a premature end when he was injured during the first half of the FA Cup preliminary round. He returned to the Southern League with Thatcham Town in October 2019 on a month's loan. The loan was extended, and he ended up playing 11 matches, 7 in the league and 4 in cup competitions, all as a starter. In December 2020, he joined yet another Southern League Division One South club, Melksham Town, on loan. At the time, the league was suspended because of the COVID-19 pandemic, and it did not restart.

After Matěj Kovář was recalled to Manchester United and Joe Fryer's short-term contract was not extended, Matthews was brought into Swindon's first-team squad in January 2021 as backup to loanee Mark Travers. Travers was recalled by AFC Bournemouth, and when his successor Joe Wollacott injured a knee during the pre-match warm-up, Matthews made an unexpected Football League debut, on 27 February in a 2–1 victory over Northampton Town at the County Ground. He allowed the ball to go through his hands for Northampton's goal, but according to the Swindon Advertiser, "his response was extremely impressive. Aside from one or two awkward moments, the 19-year-old made a handful of good saves and his kicking was excellent." By the next match, Connal Trueman arrived on loan, and then Lee Camp signed as a free agent. Matthews finished the season with 22 "appearances" as an unused substitute, and he left the club when his contract expired at the end of the season.

Birmingham City
Matthews signed for Championship club Birmingham City on 9 August 2021 on a one-year contract with the option of a second. He would initially be working with the development squad. On 16 September, Matthews joined National League South club Bath City on a month's loan. He kept a clean sheet on debut in the FA Cup second qualifying round win against ninth-tier opponents Shaftesbury, but then suffered a training-ground injury while with his parent club, and made no further appearances before his loan expired. Matthews joined National League North club Gloucester City on loan on 18 March 2022 as cover for their two injured goalkeepers. In the next day's 2–1 win away to Bradford (Park Avenue), he produced what the Bradford-based Telegraph & Argus described as "a superb save at the last to ensure three points for his new club on debut". It was his only appearance, and at the end of the season he was released by Birmingham, having made four starts for their under-23 team in the 2021–22 Premier League 2.

Swansea City
Matthews signed a two-year contract with another Championship club, Swansea City, on 1 July 2022. The deal included an option for a third year. He was an unused substitute for Swansea's EFL Cup match in August, but had no further involvement with the matchday squad, and on 13 January 2023 joined National League South club Oxford City on loan until the end of the season. He made a successful debut the next day away to Hampton & Richmond, saving a penalty, and was included in the Non-League Paper National League South Team of the Day.

Career statistics

References

External links

2001 births
Living people
Sportspeople from Swindon
English footballers
Association football goalkeepers
Swindon Town F.C. players
A.F.C. Totton players
Thatcham Town F.C. players
Melksham Town F.C. players
Birmingham City F.C. players
Bath City F.C. players
Gloucester City A.F.C. players
Swansea City A.F.C. players
Oxford City F.C. players
Southern Football League players
English Football League players
National League (English football) players